Novoland: Eagle Flag  is an 2019 Chinese television series based on the novel of the same name by Jiang Nan, set in the fictional universe of Novoland. It airs on Zhejiang TV and online platforms Tencent and Youku from July 16, 2019.

Synopsis
The series follows the rise of three young would-be heroes and their struggle against an evil warlord and swelling dark forces.

Lü Guichen is the Crown Prince of the nomadic Qingyang tribe, and is sent to Hetang Kingdom in Eastern Continent as hostage. He meets Ji Ye, an unfavoured illegitimate son who is training to become a warrior, and Yu Ran, the princess of the Winged tribe. The three become close friends, and the boys’ feelings for Yu Ran soon turn romantic.

At the same time, powerful warlord Ying Wuyi has been maintaining a firm control over the Emperor, giving him unprecedented power over the nobles. Lü Guichen, Ji Ye and Yu Ran decide to join the decisive battle against Ying Wuyi at Shangyang Pass, but unbeknownst to them, an even darker conspiracy is yet to unfold.

Cast

Main

 Liu Haoran as Lü Guichen (Asule Pasu'er)
 Crown Prince of the Qingyang tribe in the Northern Continent. Descendant of the Pasu'er family, who possesses the Qing Tong bloodline. He was weak and sickly as a child, and overlooked by his family and members of his tribe. Quiet and gentle in nature, he becomes determined to get stronger to protect his loved ones. He later became a warrior of an organization called Tianqi.
 Song Zu'er as Yu Ran
 Princess of the Winged Tribe (羽族). She is bright and spirited in nature. Innately bold and curious, she has the quick wit and bravado to match.
 Chen Ruoxuan as Ji Ye
 A skilled and fearless warrior, born the illegitimate son of a nobleman. Although harsh beginnings bear in him cold and ruthless tendencies, his hunger to prove himself betrays a childish vulnerability. He later became a warrior of Tianqi.

Supporting

Xiatang kingdom

 Zhang Jiayi as  Baili Jinghong 
 Ruler of Xiatang kingdom. Ambitious and thirsty for power, he intends to use Lu Guichen as his tool in securing his reign.
 Jiang Shuying as Gong Yuyi 
 Member of the Winged Tribe. Royal advisor of Hetang kingdom. Yu Ran's aunt.
  Li Guangjie as  Xi Yan 
 One of the Four Great Generals of the Eastern Continent (Fox general); a warrior of Tianqu. An incredibly gifted warrior and strategist, he hides his true agenda and thoughts behind a smiling, easygoing facade.
  Wang Ou  as  Su Shunqing 
 The adoptive mother of Baili Yin, who died along with him. Becomes a spirit (魅族). An assassin of Tian Luo sect. She has a complex relationship with Xi Yan.
 Liu Guancheng as Tuoba Shanyue
 One of the Four Great Generals of the Eastern Continent (Leopard general). He originally came from the Northern Continent.
 Wei Qianxiang as Baili Ningqing - Head master of the Baili tribe. Bai Lingbo's lover.
 Wei Peng as Xi Yuan - Xi Yan's nephew. Lü Guichen and Ji Ye's friend.
 Huang Yi as Baili Yu - Son of Baili Jinghong. Lü Guichen's friend.
 Liu Qiushi as Baili Yin - Son of Baili Jinghong. He died from pulling the Shangyun Guxi sword
 Feng Hui as Ji Qianzheng - Ji Ye's father.
 Fan Jinwei as Ji Changye - Ji Ye's brother.
 Chen Zhiwei as Leiyun Zhengke - Member of Hetang's Army.

Yin Empire 

 Xu Qing as Bai Lingbo 
 Grand princess of Yin Empire; aunt of Bai Luyan. Ambitious and vain, she thrives on manipulation and has a great thirst for power to cope with the struggles of aging and losing control.
 Xuan Yan as Bai Luyan - Emperor of Yin Empire.
 Chen Haoyu as Bai Zhouyue (Xiao Zhou) - Princess of Yin Empire.
 Ken Chang as Bai Yi
 Head of the Four Great Generals of the Eastern Continent (Dragon general). A master of military strategy of Chu Wei kingdom (a vassal kingdom of Yin Empire), who is cold and melancholy.

Li kingdom

  Zhang Fengyi as  Ying Wuyi 
 Ruler of Li kingdom. A powerful warlord who is incredibly accomplished and intelligent. His ambition is to overthrow the Emperor of Yin Empire and unite the Eastern Land.
 Wu Jiayi as Ying Yu - Princess of Li kingdom. Ying Wuyi's daughter.

Northern Continent 

 Dong Yong as Lü Song (Guole'er Pasu'er) - Grand Ruler of Northern Land. Chief of Qingyang tribe. Lü Guichen's father.
 Tobgyal as Mengle Huo'er - Wolf Lord; Chief of Shuobei tribe. Grandfather of Lü Yingyang and Lü Guichen.
 Li Peilu as Lü Baoyin (Elu Pasu'er) - Prince of Qingyang tribe (Ninth prince). Lü Guichen's uncle.
 Li Ye as Lü Shouyu (Beimogan Pasu'er) - Lü Guichen's eldest brother.
 Yang Le as Lü Yingyang (Xuduohan Pasu'er) - Lü Guichen's third brother. A highly ambitious man.
 Jin Song as Longge Zhenhuang (Boluha Kusa'er)
 Lü Guichen's foster father. Chief of Zhenyan tribe, which later revolts to fight against Qingyang and then becomes eliminated by Qingyang tribe.
 Yang Xinming as Da Hesa (Shahan Chaodelaji) - Sage of Qingyang, who is armed with knowledge of the world. Close and trusted friend of the Great Lord.
 Lu Yanqi as Longge Ning (Suma Kusa'er) - Daughter of Longge Zhenhuang. Lü Guichen's childhood servant and friend. She is born mute.

Others

 Zhang Zhijian as Lei Bicheng 
 A mysterious, powerful figure who lingers in the shadows and masterfully orchestrates the destruction and chaos of the Eastern Continent. Member of a denomination called Chenyue.
 Jiang Tao as Yi Tianzhan, member of the Winged Tribe. Heaven warrior. Ji Ye's teacher.
 Ji Ta as Bo Minke
 Jia Haitao as River Folk (河络). A prophet.

Production
The series is produced by Linmon Pictures and directed by Zhang Xiaobo (To Be A Better Man). It is co-written by Jiang Nan, the author of the original novel; and Chang Jiang (The Advisors Alliance). Other notable cast members include producer Zhang Weiwei, who was also on the To Be A Better Man team; Yee Chung-man as costume designer;  Peter Kam as music composer and Sun Li (Dragon) as art director. Han Lei (Kung Fu Panda), who graduated from the Texas A&M University and worked in Rhythm and Hues Studios and DreamWorks Animation, is in charge of the visual and special effects.

The series began filming at Xiangyang on November 2, 2017. The production team relocated to Xinjiang to film starting from February 7, 2018. Filming wrapped up on August 7, 2018.

Soundtrack

Reception

Ratings 

 Highest ratings are marked in red, lowest ratings are marked in blue

Awards and nominations

International broadcast

References

Novoland
Chinese fantasy television series
2019 Chinese television series debuts
Television shows based on Chinese novels
2019 Chinese television series endings
Zhejiang Television original programming